Kurtis R. Schaeffer is Professor of Tibetan and Buddhist Studies at the University of Virginia and Chair of the Religious Studies department.  His primary topics of research are the history of the regions of Nepal, India, Tibet, and China, with a focus on the forms of Buddhism present in these areas, most especially Tibetan Buddhism. Some specific issues he has been concentrated on include Indo-Tibetan poetry, the development of classical learning and printed literature in Tibetan cultural regions, and the history of women, saints, and Dalai Lamas in Tibet. For his work, Schaeffer has received Fulbright, Ryskamp, and Whiting fellowships.

Biography 
Schaeffer received a B.A. in Religious Studies from Lewis & Clark College in 1988, and an additional B.A. from the Evergreen State College in 1990.  He received a Master of Arts (M.A.) in Buddhist Studies from the University of Washington in 1995 and then a Doctorate of Philosophy (PhD) from Harvard University in 2000 in Tibetan and South Asian Religions.

In 2000, he was appointed assistant professor at the University of Alabama in the Department of Religious Studies.   In 2003, he took a leave of absence for the entire year with the backing of a Mellon Foundation Fellowship. Schaeffer was awarded tenure and promoted to the position of associate professor a year early, in 2004. In late 2005, Schaeffer took a position at the University of Virginia as an associate professor in the Department of Religious Studies, specifically in Tibetan and Buddhist studies, where he oversees the study and research of over twenty graduate students.
He is also the past co-director, with Frances Garrett, of the Tibetan and Himalayan Religious Group in the American Academy of Religion (AAR).  From 2005 to present, he served as a co-director for The Tibetan Buddhist Canonical Collections Cataloging Project for the Tibetan and Himalayan Library. He has also been Book Review Editor for the Journal of the American Academy of Religion from 2006 to the present, as well as for the Journal of the International Association for Tibetan Studies from 2005 to date.

Writings
Schaeffer has written and edited several books, as well as numerous scholarly articles. Schaeffer's first book, Himalayan Hermitess: The Life of a Tibetan Buddhist Nun, was published by Oxford University Press in 2004. In this book, Schaeffer examines the autobiography (Tib: rnam thar) of a seventeenth-century Nepalese Buddhist nun, Orgyan Chokyi. Scaheffer is particularly interested in how the autobiography reveals women's voice within Tibetan Buddhist practice, voices which are often overlooked, ignored, or silenced. Through this, he explores the unique perspectives on Tibetan Buddhist doctrine and practice Orgyan Chokyi brings to light through her autobiography, including a more localized religious life, an emphasis on the physicality of the body in practice, and a particular focus on the day-to-day reality of suffering.

Schaeffer followed Himalayan Hermitess with Dreaming the Great Brahmin: Tibetan Traditions of the Buddhist Poet Saint Saraha, where he works to broaden the idea of "tradition" as it relates to the Tibetan cultural world from the actions of a singular historical author to the multivariant roles and agencies of a given text throughout Tibetan life. In this work, Schaeffer seeks to explore the creative traditions which surrounded the figure of Saraha and gave him life throughout the Tibetan Buddhist world long after his death, including exposing conflicted, and at times, contradictory visions of the century Indian figures life, actions, and teachings.

Schaeffer has continued to encourage a broad understanding of Tibetan culture and tradition, particularly through his 2014 book, The Culture of the Book in Tibet, published through Columbia University Press. This work explores the contours of Tibetan book production, consumption, and use to reveal the significant, yet incredibly variable, role of books in Tibetan cultural life. Through this, Schaeffer reveals not only the crucial role of textual criticism and scholarship in Tibetan Buddhist practice, but also how Tibetan books simultaneously functioned as relics and sites of devotional activity.

Beyond his monographs, Schaeffer has also edited several volumes, including Among Tibetan Texts: Essays on Tibetan Religion, Literature, and History by E. Gene Smith, (Wisdom Publications, 2001), Power, Politics, and the Reinvention of Tradition: Tibet in the Seventeenth and Eighteenth Centuries (Brill Publishers, 2006; co-edited with Bryan J. Cuevas). Most recently, Schaeffer edited two volumes in 2013 for Columbia University Press--Sources of Tibetan Tradition (co-edited with Gray Tuttle) and The Tibetan History Reader (co-edited with Gray Tuttle and Matthew Kapstein)--both of which make the recent research into Tibetan history, doctrine, and culture available for both academic researchers and for students in college classrooms.

Continuing to produce foundational texts for classroom settings, Schaeffer has recently produced a translation of a life of the Buddha written by eighteenth-century Bhutanese intellectual Tenzin Chögyel (New York: Penguin Publishing, 2015). This work not only provides a clear translation of the Buddha's life narrative with helpful explanatory notes, but also includes an introduction by Schaeffer exploring the stylized format of the Buddha's life narrative and its potential to contain multiple interpretations of the Buddha's ontological identity.

Beyond monographs and edited volumes, Schaeffer has also written a number of academic papers and encyclopedia articles.

References

Year of birth missing (living people)
Living people
University of Virginia faculty
Tibetologists
Harvard University alumni
University of Washington alumni
American male writers
Tibetan Buddhism writers